Ortataxel is a drug used in chemotherapy.
, Spectrum Pharmaceuticals has the drug in a Phase 2 clinical trial.

References 

Mitotic inhibitors
Benzoate esters
Carbamates
Secondary alcohols
Lactones
Acetate esters
Taxanes